

272001–272100 

|-bgcolor=#f2f2f2
| colspan=4 align=center | 
|}

272101–272200 

|-bgcolor=#f2f2f2
| colspan=4 align=center | 
|}

272201–272300 

|-id=209
| 272209 Corsica ||  || Corsica is an island in the Mediterranean Sea and one of the 18 political regions of France. Due to Corsica's historical links to the Italian peninsula, the island keeps many Italian cultural elements, and the Corsican language is recognized as a regional language by the French government. || 
|}

272301–272400 

|-bgcolor=#f2f2f2
| colspan=4 align=center | 
|}

272401–272500 

|-bgcolor=#f2f2f2
| colspan=4 align=center | 
|}

272501–272600 

|-bgcolor=#f2f2f2
| colspan=4 align=center | 
|}

272601–272700 

|-bgcolor=#f2f2f2
| colspan=4 align=center | 
|}

272701–272800 

|-id=746
| 272746 Paoladiomede ||  || Paola Diomede (born 1968), wife of Italian amateur astronomer Sergio Foglia who discovered this minor planet || 
|}

272801–272900 

|-bgcolor=#f2f2f2
| colspan=4 align=center | 
|}

272901–273000 

|-bgcolor=#f2f2f2
| colspan=4 align=center | 
|}

References 

272001-273000